Bolivar County is a county located on the western border of the U.S. state of Mississippi. As of the 2020 census, the population was 30,985. Its county seats are Rosedale and Cleveland. The county is named in honor of Simón Bolívar, early 19th-century leader of the liberation of several South American colonies from Spain.

The Cleveland, Mississippi, Micropolitan Statistical Area includes all of Bolivar County. It is located in the Mississippi Delta, or Yazoo Basin, of Mississippi. This area was first developed for cotton plantations. Large industrial-scale agricultural operations have reduced the number of farm workers needed, and the population is half of its peak in 1930. Today, soybeans, corn, and rice are also commodity crops.

History 
In 1836, when it was founded, the land was originally Choctaw, and was taken for use in agriculture, with some of the most valued land in the state. In 1840, there was only one free black person, 384 free whites, and 971 enslaved people, making its population 60% slaves. This number only increased, because around 1860, the population was about 87% slaves, due to its mostly agricultural economy, and continued to gain a high black population, relating to it being in the delta, and  pressure for African-Americans to move to the delta. In the 1920's, Bolivar county was a hotspot for UNIA chapters, with 17 chapters, and by 1960, it had a significant local civil rights movement, and remains a mostly black area today.

Geography
It is the second-largest county in Mississippi by land area and fourth-largest by total area.

Major highways
  Future Interstate 69
  U.S. Route 61
  Mississippi Highway 1
  Mississippi Highway 8
  Mississippi Highway 32

Adjacent counties
 Coahoma County (north)
 Sunflower County (east)
 Washington County (south)
 Desha County, Arkansas (west)

National protected area
 Dahomey National Wildlife Refuge

Demographics

2020 census

As of the 2020 United States Census, there were 30,985 people, 12,114 households, and 7,719 families residing in the county.

2010 census
As of the 2010 United States Census, there were 34,145 people living in the county. 64.5% were Black or African American, 33.5% White, 0.6% Asian, 0.1% Native American, 0.9% of some other race and 0.6% of two or more races. 1.9% were Hispanic or Latino (of any race).

2000 census
As of the census of 2000, there were 40,633 people, 13,776 households, and 9,725 families living in the county.  The population density was 46 people per square mile (18/km2).  There were 14,939 housing units at an average density of [7] per square mile (7/km2).  The racial makeup of the county was 65.11% Black or African American, 33.24% White, 0.10% Native American, 0.49% Asian, 0.01% Pacific Islander, 0.48% from other races, and 0.56% from two or more races.  1.17% of the population were Hispanic or Latino of any race.

There were 13,776 households, out of which 35.20% had children under the age of 18 living with them, 38.20% were married couples living together, 27.30% had a female householder with no husband present, and 29.40% were non-families. 25.30% of all households were made up of individuals, and 9.90% had someone living alone who was 65 years of age or older.  The average household size was 2.79 and the average family size was 3.36.

In the county, the population was spread out, with 29.60% under the age of 18, 14.00% from 18 to 24, 25.70% from 25 to 44, 19.60% from 45 to 64, and 11.00% who were 65 years of age or older.  The median age was 30 years. For every 100 females there were 87.80 males.  For every 100 females age 18 and over, there were 81.70 males.

The median income for a household in the county was $23,428, and the median income for a family was $27,301. Males had a median income of $27,643 versus $20,774 for females. The per capita income for the county was $12,088.  About 27.90% of families and 33.30% of the population were below the poverty line, including 43.90% of those under age 18 and 27.90% of those age 65 or over.

Life expectancy
According to the most recent data on U.S. life expectancy, published in 2010 by the Institute for Health Metrics and Evaluation, a male in Bolivar County could expect to live 65.0 years, the second shortest for any county in the United States, following McDowell County, West Virginia. The national average is 76.1 years for a male.

Senators Robert F. Kennedy and Joseph S. Clark, Jr. had visited "pockets of poverty" in the Mississippi Delta 40 years earlier.  In Cleveland, they observed barefoot, underfed African-American children in tattered clothing, with vacant expressions and distended bellies.  Kennedy stated that he thought he had seen the worst poverty in the nation in West Virginia, but it paled in comparison to the poverty he observed in Cleveland.

Government
The county has a county administrator, who acts upon the requests of the board of supervisors primarily.

Education

Colleges and universities
 Delta State University (Cleveland)

The county is within the boundaries of two community college districts: Coahoma Community College and Mississippi Delta Community College. CCC's main campus is in rural Coahoma County outside of Clarksdale, and MDCC's campus is in Moorhead in Sunflower County.

Public School Districts
School districts:
 Cleveland School District (Cleveland)
 North Bolivar Consolidated School District (Mound Bayou; previously in Shelby)
 West Bolivar Consolidated School District (Rosedale, Shaw, and Benoit)

Former school districts:
 Benoit School District (Benoit)
 Mound Bayou School District (Mound Bayou)
 Shaw School District (Shaw)

The five school districts other than the Cleveland School District, were, in 2012, among the 20 smallest of the 152 school districts in the State of Mississippi. In the State of Mississippi, Bolivar County was the only county that had six school districts. Consolidation was urged to save money and facilitate cooperation. In 2012 the Mississippi Senate Education Committee passed a bill asking the State of Mississippi to consolidate the six school districts in Bolivar County to three or two. The Mississippi Senate passed the bill 37–11.

As recently as the 1960s the school board of Bolivar County censored what black children were allowed to learn, and mandated that "Neither foreign languages nor civics shall be taught in Negro schools. Nor shall American history from 1860 to 1875 be taught.”

Private School
 Bayou Academy (Cleveland)

Media
The Bolivar Commercial is distributed in Bolivar County.

Politics

Communities

Cities
 Cleveland (county seat)
 Rosedale (county seat)
 Mound Bayou
 Shaw (small portion in Sunflower County)
 Shelby

Towns

 Alligator
 Benoit
 Beulah
 Boyle
 Duncan
 Gunnison
 Merigold
 Pace
 Renova
 Winstonville

Census-designated places
 Bolivar
 Scott
 Skene
 Symonds

Unincorporated places

 Choctaw
 Christmas
 Dahomy
 Deeson
 Hushpuckena
 Lamont
 Litton
 Malvina
 O'Reilly
 Perthshire
 Round Lake
 Stringtown
 Waxhaw

Ghost towns

 Australia
 Concordia
 Eutaw
 Huntington
 Mound Landing
 Prentiss
 Riverton
 Victoria

Notable people

 Mary Booze
 Charles Capps
 Charles Clark (governor)
 Charles Clark (judge)
 Medgar Evers
 T.R.M. Howard
 Amzie Moore
 Peter B. Starke, state representative and state senator, Confederate general in the Civil War

 Henry Townsend (musician)

See also

 National Register of Historic Places listings in Bolivar County, Mississippi
 Delta and Providence Cooperative Farms

References

External links
 Bolivar County Board of Supervisors

 
Mississippi counties
1836 establishments in Mississippi
Populated places established in 1836
Mississippi counties on the Mississippi River
Black Belt (U.S. region)
Majority-minority counties in Mississippi